"Hey Boys and Girls (Truth of the World pt.2)" is the second single by Evermore, from their third studio album Truth of the World: Welcome to the Show.

It was also released as the group's first single in the UK in late 2009 (to promote their first international album, Evermore), but did not chart.

Track listing

Chart performance
The song was the band's third top 5 single on the ARIA Singles Chart in Australia, peaking at No. 4. It is also their second-highest charting single in Australia behind "Light Surrounding You", which topped the ARIA Singles Chart in 2007.

Year-end charts

Music video

The video opens with a boy by the name of 'Max' (holding up a bottle of pills that says "TRUTHOGEN"), who turns on the television showing the band in a dark room with about 200 dark blue TVs. The music starts playing and the TV shows dancers including soldiers, pink haired women and women in raincoats. When the chorus starts to come in, the lead singer (Jon, wearing a top-hat) starts looking happy and the dancers start to dance. The breakdown comes the camera (screen) zooms out of the TV and shows the boy watching the TV. The camera zooms back in and the dancers are dancing again. Jon is then seen without a microphone stand (just a microphone) looking excited about something and the bassist Peter doing backup video. When the video ends, the dancers run in on the band and pick them up. They begin throwing the band members around. Jon takes off his hat and throws it. The band disappears and the boy turns the TV off.

The band also shot a second video for the song for release in European markets.

Meaning
During a radio interview, lead singer Jon Hume stated "The song is just like the meaning of the album - it's just all about crazy over the top media (that) we, you know, read, see on TV. It's just having a bit of fun and having a laugh about it."

Personnel
Jon Hume – lead and backing vocals, guitar, percussion
Peter Hume – synthesizers, piano, bass, backing vocals, percussion
Dann Hume – lead and backing vocals, drums, guitar, percussion

Release history

Certifications

References

Evermore (band) songs
2009 singles
2009 songs
Warner Music Australasia singles